Tobie is an oratorio by Charles Gounod to words by Lefèvre from 1854.

Recordings
Paris Sorbonne Chorus, Paris Sorbonne Orchestra, Jacques Grimbert 1995

References

Oratorios by Charles Gounod
1854 compositions